Parson Thorne Mansion, also known as Silver Hill, is a historic mansion located at Milford, Kent County, Delaware. The mansion is located across from the Mill House. It was built between 1730 and 1735, and is a two-story, five-bay, center hall brick dwelling in the Georgian style. It has flanking one-story wings and a two-story frame rear wing. The house was remodeled in 1879, and features a steeply pitched cross-gable roof with dormers. It was the home of Delaware Governor William Burton (1789–1866) and the boyhood home of statesman John M. Clayton (1796–1856).

It was listed on the National Register of Historic Places in 1971.

References

External links

 Delaware Public Archives: Parson Thorne Mansion
 Milford Historical Society Facebook page – owns the Parson Thorne Mansion
 Visit Delaware: Parson Thorne Mansion
 

Houses on the National Register of Historic Places in Delaware
Georgian architecture in Delaware
Houses completed in 1735
Houses in Kent County, Delaware
Historic American Buildings Survey in Delaware
Milford, Delaware
Museums in Kent County, Delaware
Historic house museums in Delaware
National Register of Historic Places in Kent County, Delaware
Individually listed contributing properties to historic districts on the National Register in Delaware